Ban Don Klang Halt is a railway halt located in Krachio Subdistrict, Phachi District, Phra Nakhon Si Ayutthaya, Thailand. It is located 82.390 km from Bangkok Railway Station.

Train services 
 Commuter No. 301/302 Bangkok- Lop Buri- Bangkok (weekends only)
 Commuter No. 303 Bangkok- Lop Buri (weekdays only)
 Commuter No. 315 Lop Buri- Bangkok (weekdays only)
 Commuter No. 318 Lop Buri- Bangkok (weekdays only)
 Commuter No. 339 Bangkok- Kaeng Khoi Junction (weekdays only)
 Commuter No. 341/342 Bangkok- Kaeng Khoi Junction- Bangkok (weekdays only)
 Commuter No. 343/344 Bangkok- Kaeng Khoi Junction- Bangkok (weekends only)
 Local No.409 Ayutthaya- Lop Buri

References 
 
 
 

Railway stations in Thailand